Oosterwolde is a village in the Dutch province of Gelderland. It is located in the municipality of Oldebroek, about 15 km southwest of Zwolle. Oosterwolde was a separate municipality until 1818, when it was merged with Doornspijk.

History 
Oosterwolde was first mentioned in 1265 as "Gherardus de Ostenwalde", and means eastern forest. De Morren is an estate which was built in 1771. In 1910, it was extended to its current size. In 1840, it was home to 332 people. In 1845, a church was built and it developed into a village. In 1860, the gristmill "De Zon" was built in Oosterwolde, however it burnt down in 1976.

Gallery

References

Populated places in Gelderland
Former municipalities of Gelderland
Oldebroek